Jim Hall & Basses is an album by jazz guitarist Jim Hall performing duets and trios with bassists Dave Holland, Christian McBride, Charlie Haden, George Mraz and Scott Colley that was released by Telarc in 2001.

Reception 

Ken Dryden, writing for AllMusic, said  "Jim Hall is no stranger to guitar/bass duets after several memorable outings with the likes of Ron Carter and Red Mitchell, but this series of studio sessions is even more challenging, mixing it up  ... Hall's skills as a composer are vastly underrated by the jazz audience as a whole, but his fellow players recognize his formidable skills. ... Hall's adventuresome streak as a composer, arranger, and performer continues to flourish"

The PopMatters review by Maurice Bottomly said that "this is not as immediately appealing a set as one would have hoped. It is worth getting to know but the whole project suffers from being a little too self-contained and introverted. Hall's inventiveness wins out in the end but it might take you at least a couple of listens to overcome the feeling that this is music for a specialist audience only"

In JazzTimes, Jim Ferguson wrote "In the hands of a lesser figure, a project such as this could easily turn into an exercise in excess, but Hall’s taste and integrity keep it on an artistic track throughout, making this a real treat for not only his admirers, but also anyone who appreciates fine, creative music".

Track listing
All compositions by Jim Hall except where noted
 "End the Beguine!" − 6:35
 "Bent Blue" − 5:00
 "Abstract 1" (Hall, Charlie Haden) − 4:31
 "All the Things You Are" (Jerome Kern, Oscar Hammerstein II) − 6:22
 "Abstract 2" (Hall, Scott Colley, George Mraz) − 3:24
 "Sam Jones" − 3:11
 "Don't Explain" (Billie Holiday, Arthur Herzog Jr.) − 8:39
 "Dog Walk" − 6:21
 "Abstract 3" (Hall, Colley, Mraz) − 5:10
 "Bésame Mucho" (Consuelo Velázquez) − 6:14
 "Dream Steps" − 4:16
 "Abstract 4" (Hall, Colley) − 2:30
 "Tango Loco" − 5:29

Personnel
 Jim Hall – guitar
 Dave Holland (tracks 1 & 6), Christian McBride (tracks 2 & 8), Charlie Haden (tracks 3 & 7), George Mraz (tracks 4, 5, 9 & 13), Scott Colley (tracks 5 & 9-13) –bass

References

Jim Hall (musician) albums
1999 albums
Instrumental albums